The Baldwin DR-4-4-15 was a  cab unit-type diesel locomotive built for freight service by the Baldwin Locomotive Works between November 1947 and June 1950.  It was produced in two different body types, nicknamed the "Babyface" and "Sharknose" styles by railfans, though Baldwin used the same model number for both.  22 "Babyface" cab-equipped A units were built, along with 11 cabless booster B units; 36 "Sharknose" A units and 36 B units were constructed, making a total for all models of 105 locomotives built.

Original buyers

"Babyface" units produced (1947–1948)

"Sharknose" units produced (1949–1950)

References

External links
 Baldwin DR4-4-1500 (Babyface) Roster
 Baldwin DR4-4-1500 (Sharknose) Roster
 PRR Diesel Locomotive diagrams: Baldwin DR-4-4-15 "A" (freight shark)
 PRR Diesel Locomotive diagrams: Baldwin DR-4-4-15 "B" (freight shark)

Diesel-electric locomotives of the United States
B-B locomotives
DR-4-4-15
Railway locomotives introduced in 1947
Locomotives with cabless variants
Scrapped locomotives
Standard gauge locomotives of the United States
Streamlined diesel locomotives